Rufus Arnold Alexis Keppel, 10th Earl of Albemarle (born 16 July 1965), known as Viscount Bury from 1968 to 1979, is a British designer.

Early life and education
Albemarle is the son of Derek Keppel, Viscount Bury (1911–1968), and his second wife, the former Marina Davidoff, a daughter of Count Serge Orloff-Davidoff. Since his father predeceased his grandfather, the 9th Earl of Albemarle, Keppel succeeded to the earldom at the age of fourteen on the death of his paternal grandfather in 1979. He is known professionally as Rufus Albemarle.

Keppel's early life was spent living with his parents successively in England and Italy. He was educated at St Christopher School, Letchworth, in Hertfordshire, and Chelsea School of Art in London, as well as Central St Martins School of Art & Design. He worked as an industrial designer in Milan and a graphic and branding designer in New York, where he later founded a men's-shirt company Albemarle of London. He is now residing in the United Kingdom.

Marriage and child
The Earl of Albemarle married Sally Claire Tadayon, a sculptor of Danish and Persian ancestry, in 2001 in Havana, Cuba. Tom Ford of Yves St Laurent designed the bride's gown and the wedding was featured in Town & Country and Vanity Fair.

Now divorced, they have one child, who is heir apparent to the earldom:
 Augustus Sergei Darius Keppel, Viscount Bury, born in 2003.

Lord Great Chamberlain 

Through his grandmother, Lord Albemarle has a one-twentieth share in the succession for the office of Lord Great Chamberlain, one of the Great Officers of State in England and Wales.

Notes

References

External links

Albemarle of London
Rufus Keppel, 10th Earl of Albemarle

1965 births
Living people
Rufus
Rufus Keppel, 10th Earl of Albemarle
Albemarle